Almond is a village located in the town of Almond in Allegany County, New York, United States. The population was 466 at the 2010 census. Because the village is located on the county line, a small part is in the town of Hornellsville in Steuben County.

History 

The first people to settle in the Karr Valley area came from Luzerne County, Pennsylvania in 1796. After the legal formation of Allegany County, New York in 1806, the area that would become Almond was initially a part of the town of Alfred, New York. In 1821, Almond was separated from Alfred by an "act of Legislature." 

Notably, the area was not named after the almond tree nut, but rather after the Almond River near Edinburgh, Scotland, from where its settlers came. The village's residents pronounce the town's name with the Scottish pronunciation, which is closer to "Ellmund". 

In the early 1800s, Almond "thrived... with many mills and factories popping up along the narrow creek and Main Street." However, the town's economic growth was limited by the size of the narrow valley it inhabited, and was reportedly "maxed out" in the 1840s. As a result, new businesses opted to move into neighboring towns like Hornell. By the early 1900s, the town's economy had stagnated significantly; old factories burned down and owners opted to rebuild in other locations, rather than in Almond.

Geography
According to the United States Census Bureau, the village has a total area of 0.6 square mile (1.5 km2), all land.

Canacadea Creek flows through the village. The Southern Tier Expressway (Interstate 86 and New York State Route 17) and New York State Route 21 pass through the village.

Demographics

As of the census of 2000, there were 461 people, 194 households, and 117 families residing in the village.  The population density was 816.3 people per square mile (317.8/km2).  There were 214 housing units at an average density of 378.9 per square mile (147.5/km2).  The racial makeup of the village was 97.83% White, 0.87% Asian, 0.87% from other races, and 0.43% from two or more races. Hispanic or Latino of any race were 0.87% of the population.

There were 194 households, out of which 28.4% had children under the age of 18 living with them, 46.4% were married couples living together, 11.9% had a female householder with no husband present, and 39.2% were non-families. 34.5% of all households were made up of individuals, and 11.9% had someone living alone who was 65 years of age or older.  The average household size was 2.38 and the average family size was 3.09.

In the village, the population was spread out, with 26.9% under the age of 18, 8.5% from 18 to 24, 27.3% from 25 to 44, 24.9% from 45 to 64, and 12.4% who were 65 years of age or older.  The median age was 36 years. For every 100 females, there were 88.2 males.  For every 100 females age 18 and over, there were 88.3 males.

The median income for a household in the village was $31,000, and the median income for a family was $42,000. Males had a median income of $35,714 versus $21,563 for females. The per capita income for the village was $18,509.  About 11.5% of families and 16.6% of the population were below the poverty line, including 27.3% of those under age 18 and 8.2% of those age 65 or over.

Notable person
 Carol Fenner, author

References

External links
 Town of Almond

Populated places established in 1806
Villages in New York (state)
Villages in Steuben County, New York
Villages in Allegany County, New York
1806 establishments in New York (state)